Sayers Creek or Sawyer Creek is a stream in Webster and Greene counties of southern Missouri. The headwaters of the stream are in Webster County just to the east of Rogersville and north of U. S. Route 60. The confluence with the James River in Greene County is north of Oak Grove Heights and just east of Missouri Route 125.

Location

Name
Sayers Creek has the name of Tom, John and Hiram Sayer, original owners of the site.

See also
List of rivers of Missouri

References

Rivers of Greene County, Missouri
Rivers of Webster County, Missouri
Rivers of Missouri